Gaston Bussière (April 24, 1862 in Cuisery – October 29, 1928 or 1929 in Saulieu) was a French Symbolist painter and illustrator.

Biography
Bussière studied at l'Académie des Beaux-Arts in Lyon before entering the école des beaux-arts de Paris where he studied under Alexandre Cabanel and Pierre Puvis de Chavannes. In 1884, he won the Marie Bashkirtseff prize.

He was close to Gustave Moreau. He found inspiration in the theatre works of Berlioz (La Damnation de Faust) as well as William Shakespeare and Richard Wagner. He became in demand as an illustrator, creating works for major authors.  He illustrated Honoré de Balzac's Splendeurs et misères des courtisanes published in 1897, Émaux et camées, written by Théophile Gautier, as well as Oscar Wilde's Salomé. He also illustrated several works by Flaubert.

An associate of Joséphin Péladan, the founder of the Rose-Croix esthétique, Bussière exhibited his works at Salon de la Rose-Croix over two years.

Many of his works are on exhibit at the Musée des Ursulines in Mâcon.

Gallery

References

External links 

Inventory of paintings by Gaston Bussière on the French Ministry of Culture database Joconde
A biography is available through the Burgundy museums Website

19th-century French painters
French male painters
20th-century French painters
20th-century French male artists
French Symbolist painters
French illustrators
1862 births
1928 deaths
École des Beaux-Arts alumni
Symbolist artists
Symbolist painters
19th-century French male artists